Nacientes del Teno Formation is a geological formation that crops out near the uppermost reaches of Teno River, in the Andes of central Chile. The formation is similar to Nacientes del Biobío Formation further south.

References 

Geologic formations of Chile
Jurassic System of South America
Early Jurassic South America
Middle Jurassic South America
Late Jurassic South America
Jurassic Argentina
Jurassic Chile
Oxfordian Stage
Bajocian Stage
Geology of Maule Region